Mitchell Wilson Lichtenstein (born March 10, 1956) is an American actor, writer, producer and director.

Early life and education 
The son of Isabel (née Wilson) and Roy Lichtenstein, he studied acting at Bennington College in Vermont. His father is of Jewish background.

Career 
Mitchell's first film role was in the 1983 film Lords of Discipline, filmed largely at Wellington College in the UK. In Ang Lee's film The Wedding Banquet (1993), Lichtenstein played the partner of a gay Taiwanese man living in the United States who is forced to marry by his parents. Other film acting credits include Streamers, for which he and other members of the cast Guy Boyd, George Dzundza, David Alan Grier, Matthew Modine and Michael Wright were awarded the Volpi Cup for Best Actor from the Venice Film Festival.

He produced, wrote, and directed the 2007 black comedy horror film Teeth, about the pitfalls and power of a girl as a living example of the vagina dentata myth. The film premiered at the 2007 Sundance Film Festival to positive reviews.

His film Happy Tears premiered at the Berlin International Film Festival in 2009. His film Angelica and was selected to be screened in the Panorama section of the 65th Berlin International Film Festival.

Personal life 
He is gay.

Filmography

Acting

Film

Television

Directing

References

External links

1956 births
Living people
Jewish American male actors
American male film actors
American people of German-Jewish descent
Volpi Cup for Best Actor winners
Bennington College alumni
American gay actors
Yale School of Drama alumni
LGBT Jews
21st-century American Jews